The Lodge Reservations, written by United States Senator Henry Cabot Lodge, the Republican Majority Leader and Chairman of the Committee on Foreign Relations, were fourteen reservations to the Treaty of Versailles and other proposed post-war agreements. The Treaty called for the creation of a League of Nations in which the promise of mutual security would hopefully prevent another major world war; the League charter, primarily written by President Woodrow Wilson, let the League set the terms for war and peace. If the League called for military action, all members would have to join in.

Lodge wanted to join the League of Nations with reservations.  The Democrats in the Senate, following Wilson's direction, rejected Lodge's proposal to join the League with his reservations. Republicans opposed joining under Wilson's terms of no reservations, allowing the League to force the U.S. to enter a war without approval of Congress. In the end the Senate voted down the Treaty of Versailles in 1919 and never joined the new League of Nations.  Lodge's reservations were eventually incorporated into the United Nations in 1945, where the U.S. had a veto.

The Lodge Reservations
Lodge's reservations proposed to give much power back to the United States in its interactions with other nations. A summary of each reservation follows:

Reservation One

Article 1 of the Treaty of Versailles permitted any member state voluntarily to withdraw from the League of Nations "provided that all its international obligations and all its obligations under this Covenant shall have been fulfilled." Lodge's first reservation clarified that the League could not use this clause to prevent a member state from withdrawing — at least, not when that member state was the United States.

A concurrent resolution of Congress requires the consent of both houses of Congress, but, significantly, does not require the consent of the President.

Reservation Two
Nothing compels the United States to ensure the border integrity or political independence of any nation, to interfere in foreign domestic disputes, or to involve the military, without a Congressional declaration of war.

For many Republicans in the Senate, Article X was the most objectionable provision. Their objections were based on the fact that, by ratifying such a document, the United States would be bound by an international contract to defend a League of Nations member if it was attacked. Henry Cabot Lodge from Massachusetts and Frank B. Brandegee from Connecticut led the fight in the U.S. Senate against ratification, believing that it was best not to become involved in international conflicts. In fact, the intent of Article X was to preserve a balance of power by preventing one country from invading another (e.g. Germany invading Belgium and France); it did not take away the right of the United States to wage war as shown by the actual wording of Article X:

Article 10

The Members of the League undertake to respect and preserve as against external aggression the territorial integrity and existing political independence of all Members of the League. In case of any such aggression or in case of any threat or danger of such aggression the Council shall advise upon the means by which this obligation shall be fulfilled.

Reservation Three
Article 22 of the Treaty of Versailles dealt with the creation and administration of League of Nations mandates. Lodge's third reservation proposed that Congress should be able to reject administering, developing, or defending any territorial mandate that the League might try to assign to it.

Reservation Four

Reservation Five
The United States is not to be questioned about the Monroe Doctrine, or about its interpretation of the Monroe Doctrine.

Reservation Six

Articles 156–158 of the Treaty of Versailles transferred Germany's concessions on the Shandong Peninsula from Germany to Japan. Under Article 10 of the treaty, signatories would have been responsible for preserving Japan's new border — effectively taking Japan's side in the event of a subsequent war between Japan and China.

Reservation Seven
Congress alone shall approve the United States' delegates to the League of Nations. Should no delegate ever be appointed, authorization to deal with the League is explicitly denied to any other person (significantly, even to the President).

A contemporary analyst observed: "As this is a matter left to each government to determine for itself, there seems no adequate reason for incorporating such a reservation in the ratification act."

Reservation Eight
Trade between Germany and the United States can only be interfered with approval from Congress.

Reservation Nine
The United States is not obligated to pay any money to the League of Nations.

Reservation Ten
If the United States limits its military might because of an order by the League of Nations, it can, at any time and without warning, build it up again if threatened.

Reservation Eleven
The United States reserves the right to allow peoples of states which break the Treaty of Versailles who live in the United States to continue their lives in the United States.

Reservation Twelve

Reservation Thirteen
If the League of Nations is to create any future organizations, the United States is not bound to join so no matter as to how the League of Nations wishes concerning their involvement. Instead, Congress has the right to make the decision as to whether or not the United States chooses to be involved and the terms of their involvement.

Reservation Fourteen
The United States will not be bound by any vote in the League of Nations in which a nation has voted twice, through the use of colonial possessions. Neither will it be bound by a vote which concerns a dispute between the United States and another member state, if that state has voted. This reservation was specifically intended to deal with the voting power of Dominions of the British Empire in the Assembly of the League of Nations.

Henry Cabot Lodge and Republicanism
The Treaty of Versailles posed ideological problems for many Republicans, including Henry Cabot Lodge. Most contentious of its propositions was the Covenant that called for the creation of a League of 46 nations to arbitrate international law and maintain peace for the indefinite future. The contents of Article 10 specifically required that the United States Congress relinquish its authority over whether the United States commits itself to warfare. Lodge even recorded his personal position on August 11, 1919:

if there had been no proposition such as is included in Article 10, but a simple proposition that it would be our intention to aid France, which is our barrier and outpost, when attacked without provocation by Germany, I should have strongly favored it for I feel very keenly the sacrifices of France and the immense value her gallant defense was to the whole world. But they have made the French treaty subject to the authority of the League, which is not to be tolerated. If we ever are called upon to go to the assistance of France as we were two years ago, we will go without asking anybody's leave. It is humiliating to be put in such an attitude and not the least of the mischief done by the League is that Article 10 will probably make it impossible to do anything for France as Root recommends and as many of our Senators desire.

Lodge, in fact, favored many of the clauses of the Treaty and similar proposals by League supporters. It could be said that Lodge's beliefs resembled the features of the peace program of French Prime Minister Georges Clemenceau, by voicing admiration for the said program in his memorandum. The underpinnings of Lodge's acceptance of the peace program and reservations to the Treaty of Versailles highlight Wilson's opportunity to compromise with a senator who shared similar, if not identical, ideals. (memorandum, [Dec. 2, 1918,] Henry Cabot Lodge Papers (Massachusetts Historical Society); Congressional Record, 65 cong., 3 Sess., 724-28 (Dec. 21, 1918).) One of the ideals was the control of military states, especially in reaction to Germany.

During negotiations with diplomat Henry White over the impending peace settlement, Lodge emphasized that "the first and controlling purpose of the peace must be to put Germany in such a position that it will be physically impossible for her to break out again upon other nations with a war for world conquest." As was then common among political leaders, Lodge believed that Germany should pay the maximum indemnity which it could afford. Moreover, he believed that postwar matters must not be muddled by an indefinite covenant, a belief that contrasted with some previous statements that Lodge had made, such as his commencement address at Union College, Schenectady, New York, on June 9, 1915, in which he said that "in differences between nations which go beyond the limited range of arbititrable questions peace can only be maintained by putting behind it the force of united nations determined to uphold it and prevent war."

Statements like those imply possible inconsistency within Lodge's views, but many interpret Lodge, especially considering his correspondences, as a nationalist who simply disfavored aspects of the Covenant. In correspondence to Lodge, Senators Knox and Root sent a letter that explained the distinction between the League and an alliance. The three senators shared an aversion to the commitments of Article 10 as they generally accepted that it would impel the US into the enforcement of all international law. Lodge and future President Calvin Coolidge also exchanged over 400 letters from 1888 to 1924, the bulk of which centered on the 1919–1920 conflict over the League of Nations. The letters document twenty years of Lodge's expansionism and nationalism—especially in his opinions U.S. foreign policy in Latin America during the administrations of Taft and Wilson, which thus question claims that Lodge was strictly an isolationist.

Defeat of the treaty by senatorial debate
On September 16, 1919, Senator Lodge called the treaty up for consideration by the full Senate. On November 15, the chamber was still considering the treaty when for the first time in its history, the Senate successfully voted to invoke cloture, cutting off debate on the treaty. Four days later, the Senate voted on Lodge's resolution to advise and consent to ratification subject to the reservations. The vote was 39 in favor and 55 opposed. A two-thirds vote being required, the resolution failed. The senators who favored ratification of the treaty without reservations had joined with the "irreconcilables," those who opposed the treaty under any circumstances, to defeat the reservations. The Senate then considered a resolution to advise and consent to ratification of the treaty without reservations. The vote was 38 in favor and 53 opposed. A two-thirds vote being required, the resolution failed.

The final blow occurred on March 19, 1920, when the treaty with reservations was again defeated, 49 in favor to 35 against.

Many historians attribute the treaty's failure to Wilson's diminished health at the time of the defeat and to his total unwillingness to compromise. On October 2, 1919, Wilson suffered a massive stroke that affected the left side of his body. He gradually recovered from this stroke, but took its toll on his health. Thomas A. Bailey wrote that "Wilson's physical and mental condition had a profoundly important bearing on the final defeat of the treaty." Several prominent thinkers believed that if Wilson had been functioning at his pre-stroke level, he would have been able to bridge the discrepancies between the two forms of Reservations on the treaty.

Wilson's doctor, Edwin A. Weinstein, felt that "had Wilson been in full health, he would have found the formula to reconcile the differences between the Lodge and Hitchcock Reservations." (Arthur Link) His illness affected him in that it incapacitated part of his left side. After the stroke, Wilson would distance himself from his paralyzed arm by referring to the arm as "it". His stroke also seemed to polarize his emotions (Arthur Link), causing him to become even more stubborn when dealing with the reservations.

Another factor in the defeat of the treaty was Wilson's staunch belief that the people supported him. He refused to compromise and so, according to Bailey, betrayed the League. Wilson's refusal led him to formulate his "Jackson Day" letter in which he calamitously made the treaty an issue of the upcoming 1920 presidential election. The letter sealed the fate of the treaty by converting a nonpartisan issue into a hostage of party loyalty and politics.

References

Further reading
 Ambrosius, Lloyd E.. "Woodrow Wilson's Health and the Treaty Fight, 1919–1920."  International History Review 9.1 (1987): 73-84. in JSTOR
 Bailey, Thomas A.. Woodrow Wilson and the Great Betrayal (1945).
 Cooper, John Milton. Breaking the Heart of the World: Woodrow Wilson and the Fight for the League of Nations (Cambridge University Press, 2001).
 Garraty, John A. Henry Cabot Lodge: A Biography (1953).
 Graebner, Norman A., and Edward M. Bennett, eds. The Versailles Treaty and its legacy: the failure of the Wilsonian vision (Cambridge UP, 2011).
 Gross, Leo, "The Charter of the United Nations and the Lodge Reservations." American Journal of International Law 41.3 (1947): 531-554. in JSTOR 
 Hewes, James E. "Henry Cabot Lodge and the League of Nations." Proceedings of the American Philosophical Society 114.4 (1970): 245-255. in JSTOR
 Link, Arthur. "Woodrow Wilson's Perspective." MPH Intranet. N.p., n.d. Web. 17 Mar. 2010. <http://web.mph.net/academic/history/ecurtis/20thc-us-for-policy/readings/wilson%20era/arthur_link.htm>.
 Mervin, David. "Henry Cabot Lodge and the League of Nations." Journal of American Studies 4#2 (1971): 201-214.

Primary sources
 Pyne, John, and Sesso, Gloria. "Woodrow Wilson and the U.S. Ratification of the Treaty of Versailles" OAH Magazine of History. (17 Mar. 2010). online
 Stone, Ralph A., ed. Wilson and the League of Nations: Why America's Rejection? (1967), short excerpts from primary and secondary sources.
Lodge, Henry Cabot. "Treaty of peace with Germany – Google Books." Google Books. N.p., n.d. Web. 17 Mar. 2010. <https://books.google.com/books?id=fLYWAAAAYAAJ&printsec=frontcover#v=onepage&q=&f=false>.
"Modern History Sourcebook: Woodrow Wilson: Fourteen Points, 1918." FORDHAM.EDU. N.p., n.d. Web. 17 Mar. 2010. <http://www.fordham.edu/halsall/mod/1918wilson.html>.
"The Senate and the League of Nations." Mount Holyoke College, South Hadley, Massachusetts. N.p., n.d. Web. 17 Mar. 2010. <http://www.mtholyoke.edu/acad/intrel/doc41.htm>.
"the Senate and the League of Nations." Mt. Holyoke. N.p., n.d. Web. 17 Mar. 2010. <http://newgenevacenter.org/06_Historical-Documents/1919_Lodge%27s-reservations-concerning-the-Versailles-Treaty.html>.

Treaty of Versailles
League of Nations
65th United States Congress
History of United States isolationism